Music for a Darkened Theatre: Film & Television Music Volume Two is a double-disc compilation album of select film scores and music for television written between 1990 and 1996 by American composer Danny Elfman. It is the second compilation of Elfman's early film work after Music for a Darkened Theatre: Film & Television Music Volume One.

In addition to suites of music from his popular scores to Edward Scissorhands, Mission: Impossible and The Nightmare Before Christmas, the album featured never-before or never-since released music from the films Freeway and Dead Presidents, the television series Amazing Stories, Pee-wee's Playhouse, The Flash and Beetlejuice: The Animated TV Series, and a commercial spot for Nike.

Originally released on the now-defunct label MCA Soundtracks, the album was later transferred to Geffen Records, and is currently out of print.

Track listing 

Total length of both albums is 2:25:40.

Liner notes
Danny Elfman comments on many of the selections in the liner notes that accompany the album, writing that Edward Scissorhands is one of his personal favorite scores, he wrote ten themes for The Nightmare Before Christmas, he performed guitar on To Die For, Dead Presidents was his first percussion-based score, and Freeway was his first "improvised" score.

References

1996 compilation albums
Danny Elfman soundtracks
Compilation albums by American artists
Soundtrack compilation albums
Sequel albums